Centromadia is a genus of North American plants in the tribe Madieae within the family Asteraceae.

Species
Centromadia fitchii (A.Gray) Greene - California, southwestern Oregon
Centromadia parryi (Greene) Greene - California, Baja California
Centromadia perennis Greene - Baja California Sur
Centromadia pungens (Hook. & Arn.) Greene - Baja California, western United States

References

Asteraceae genera
Madieae